Feedback is the fifth album by the rock band Spirit.  Released in 1972, it was the first Spirit album without original members Jay Ferguson and Mark Andes, and it was also the only Spirit album that did not feature Randy California performing on it, as California had left the group to pursue a solo career 
(Kapt. Kopter and the (Fabulous) Twirly Birds).

Feedback reached the same chart position on the U.S. Billboard album charts as its predecessor, Twelve Dreams of Dr. Sardonicus.

Description
Feedback was the only Spirit album to feature John and Al Staehely as band members. Musically it was a different turn for the band, in favor of a country influenced hard rock style and lyrics mostly dealing with conventional male-female love topics, with only the tracks "Darkness" and the instrumentals "Puesta Del Scam" and "Trancas Fog-Out" recalling Spirit's earlier psychedelic rock.  Although the album was not widely heard in later years, it finally surfaced on compact disc and received some extremely satisfying notices. The Feedback tour saw the remaining original members (Locke and Cassidy) leave the band during the tour, and John and Al Staehely regrouped the band under a new name, Sta-Hay-Lee, recording another album self-titled under the Sta-Hay-Lee name in 1973.  John Staehely would later join Jay Ferguson's band Jo Jo Gunne.

Al Staehely, already a lawyer at the time, went on to become a full-time entertainment lawyer.

Track listing 
All songs written by Al Staehely except noted.

† - CD bonus track

Personnel

Spirit 
John Christian Staehely [credited as Chris Staehely] - guitar, backing vocals
John Locke - keyboards
Al Staehely - bass, lead vocals
Ed Cassidy - drums

Production 
David Briggs - producer
David Brown - engineer

Charts 
Album

References 

Spirit (band) albums
1972 albums
Epic Records albums
Albums produced by David Briggs (producer)